Tlapa de Comonfort, often shortened to Tlapa and known as Tinda'i in Mixtec, is a city in the mountain region of the Mexican state of Guerrero. It also serves as the municipal seat for the surrounding municipality of the same name.

"Tlapa" is a Nahuatl exonym from tlappan or tluhpan, meaning "place of washing". The "de Comonfort" part of the name is in homage to President Ignacio Comonfort.

History
The Codex Azoyú indicates that the city now known as Tlapa was founded between 1724 and 1756 (It's impossible the Azoyu codex was written during the 16th century). References to it also exist in codices and wood carvings from the town of Chiepetlán, claiming it was founded in 1607, and in the Humboldt Codex.

The municipality was founded in 1912, with the excision of Guerrero from the states of Puebla and México. It received city status in 1920.

Modern day
The 2005 INEGI Census reported a population of 37,975 in the municipal seat.
The current mayor is Victoriano Wences of the PT

Geography
 
 1,100 metres above sea level

References

 Portal Oficial del Gobierno del Estado de Guerrero

External links 

 Tlapa municipal government
 Tlapa de Comonfort (guerrero.gob.mx)

Populated places in Guerrero